Bob was a dog  who received the Dickin Medal in 1944 from the People's Dispensary for Sick Animals for bravery in service during the Second World War.

The Dickin Medal is often referred to as the animal metaphorical equivalent of the Victoria Cross.

See also
List of individual dogs

References

External links
 PDSA Dickin Medal, including "Roll of Honor" PDF

Military animals of World War II
Individual dogs awarded the Dickin Medal